Brentsville Courthouse and Jail is a historic courthouse and jail located at Brentsville, Prince William County, Virginia. The courthouse was built in 1822, and is a two-story, Federal style brick building.  It features a fanlight over the main entrance, within a keyed, semicircular brick arch and an octagonal-roofed, frame-built cupola.  The Brentsville Jail was built about 1820, and is located 30 yards from the courthouse. It is a well-constructed, two-story, gable roofed structure. The county seat was moved to Manassas in the 1890s to the Prince William County Courthouse and the courthouse and jail were abandoned.

It was added to the National Register of Historic Places in 1989.

Brentsville Courthouse Historic Centre
Brentsville Courthouse Historic Centre is an open-air museum centered around the restored 1825-period courthouse.  The museum is owned and operated by Prince William County Historic Preservation Division and interprets the history of Brentsville and Prince William County through three centuries. 
 
The Brentsville site consists of 28 acres with five historic buildings and several archaeological sites.  Visitors can tour the interior of the restored courthouse, Union Church and 1853 Haislip-Hall House. There are plans to restore the jail and a one-room schoolhouse.

References

External links
 Brentsville Courthouse Historic Centre - Prince William County

County courthouses in Virginia
Courthouses on the National Register of Historic Places in Virginia
Jails on the National Register of Historic Places in Virginia
Federal architecture in Virginia
Government buildings completed in 1822
Buildings and structures in Prince William County, Virginia
National Register of Historic Places in Prince William County, Virginia
Jails in Virginia
Museums in Prince William County, Virginia
Open-air museums in Virginia
1822 establishments in Virginia